The White Wolf Fault is a fault in southern California, located along the northwestern transition of the Tejon Hills and Tehachapi Mountains with the San Joaquin Valley. It is north of the intersection of the San Andreas Fault and the Garlock Fault, and roughly parallel with the latter. It is classed as a reverse (vertical motion) fault with a left lateral (sinistral) component.

Activity
The White Wolf Fault was the source of the 1952 Kern County earthquake on July 21 (M=7.3).

See also
1857 Fort Tejon earthquake – 7.9 magnitude earthquake on the San Andreas Fault in the Tehachapi Mountains''.

References 
 Steinbrugge, Karl V., and Moran, Donald F. (1954) An Engineering Study of the Southern California Earthquake of July 21, 1952, and its Aftershocks. Bulletin of the Seismological Society of America, Vol. 44,  No. 2B, pp. 201–462.
 Stein. R. S. (1981) Seismic and aseismic deformation associated with the 1952 Kern County, California Earthquake and relationship to the Quaternary history of the White Wolf Fault, Journal of Geophysical Research, Vol. 86, No. NB6, pp. 4913–4928.
 Dreger D., Savage B. (1999) Aftershocks of the 1952 Kern County, California, earthquake sequence, Bulletin of the Seismological Society of America, Vol. 89, No. 4, pp. 1094–1108.
 Bawden, G. W. (2001) Source parameters for the 1952 Kern County earthquake, California: A joint inversion of leveling and triangulation observations, Journal of Geophysical Research, Vol. 106, No. B1, pp. 771–785.

External links
Kern County Earthquake – Southern California Earthquake Center

Seismic faults of California
Tehachapi Mountains
Geology of Kern County, California
Natural history of Kern County, California
Structural geology